Karasay District (former Kaskelen District) is a district of Almaty Region in Kazakhstan. The administrative center of the district is the town of Kaskelen. Population:

References

Districts of Kazakhstan
Almaty Region
Populated places established in 1929